Road-Sea Southampton, commonly referred to as RS Southampton, was a semi-professional football club,  based near Southampton, England, best known for moving directly from playing in amateur league park level football to the semi-professional Southern League during their fourteen-year existence.

History

Road-Sea were founded in 1973 and were named after their corporate sponsors (a locally based freight shipping company). The club originally played in the City of Southampton Sunday League, where they won every possible honour as they rose up through the divisions. In 1976–77 they reached the semi-final of the FA Sunday Cup.

Road-Sea then purchased some land at Staplewood, Marchwood, near Southampton and with the aid of the company's financial backing, and momentum from team manager Peter Price, saw the facilities develop. This resulted in an ambitious application to join the semi-professional Southern League being surprisingly accepted in 1982, despite the club having no previous history of playing Saturday football.

Whilst in the Southern League Southern Division, Road-Sea silenced their critics as they pushed for promotion to the Premier Division and after finishing a creditable 3rd in their debut season behind champions Fisher Athletic and Folkestone, they won promotion as champions in 1983–84. That season, they also enjoyed a fine run in the FA Vase where they reached Round 5 before being eliminated 1–2 away at Leyton Wingate.

Road-Sea continued to thrive in the highly competitive Premier Division as they then finished 5th in 1984–85. The following season was much tougher and the club finished mid-table.

In 1986 Road-Sea decided to withdraw from the league and become founder members of the new Wessex League (formed that year mostly by the Hampshire League's top clubs with the best facilities). Road-Sea then finished runners-up, reached the final of the Hampshire Senior Cup and won both the League Cup and Russell Cotes Cup, but the club's short but successful history was ended suddenly in 1987 when the Road-Sea company withdrew their financial backing, which resulted in the club's almost immediate demise.

The club's home ground, Road-Sea Park was later sold to Southampton F.C. who use it to stage reserve team and youth team games, as well as a training base.

Honours
Southern League Southern Division
Champions 1983–84
Wessex League
Runners-up 1986–87
Wessex League Cup
Winners 1986–87
Hampshire FA Senior Cup
Finalists 1986–87
Hampshire FA Russell Cotes Cup
Winners 1986–87

Playing Records

League

FA Cup

FA Trophy

FA Vase

Famous Players

A number of former professionals played for Road-Sea Southampton during their Southern League days. These include Kevin Dawtry (former Southampton, Crystal Palace and Bournemouth), Pat Earles (former Southampton and Reading), goalkeeper Ian Turner (for Grimsby Town, Walsall and Southampton, where he played in the memorable 1976 FA Cup winning team), Paul Bennett (former Southampton, Reading and Aldershot) and Dean Mooney, the former Bournemouth striker.

References

External links
http://www.nonleaguefooty.co.uk/club/road-sea-southampton.html

Defunct football clubs in England
Sport in Southampton
Association football clubs established in 1973
Association football clubs disestablished in 1987
Southern Football League clubs
Defunct football clubs in Hampshire
1973 establishments in England
1987 disestablishments in England